Sky Christopherson (born January 19, 1976) is an American  entrepreneur, Olympic cyclist, world record holder, and  motivational speaker. He has been covered by Forbes, Sports Illustrated, Wired, Outside magazine, the Financial Times, and other publications. In 2015 he was voted 5th nationwide in "Top 40 under 40 in Healthcare Innovation" 

An athlete on the U.S. Cycling Team and alternate for the 1996 Olympic Team and winner of the 2000 Olympic Trials, Christopherson is known for breaking a world record in 2011 in the velodrome sprint, notably using a ‘digital health’ model inspired by Dr. Eric Topol. The previous holder of the record, Steven Alfred, subsequently received a lifetime ban for performance-enhancing drug use.

He founded the real estate photography company Vicaso in 2006, and the biometrics and genomics health company Optimized Athlete in 2012. Optimized Athlete consulted with the 2012 women's cycling team prior to the 2012 London Olympics.

The Greater Meaning of Water, his first feature documentary, was released in 2010, and was given the ‘Audience Choice’ and 'Best Cinematography' awards at the Los Angeles All Sports Film Festival, and 'Best Spiritual Film' at the 2010 Amsterdam International Film Festival. He has a pending documentary, Personal Gold.

Early life
Sky Christopherson was born on January 19, 1976 to American parents, and raised by his parents in Tucson, Arizona in the United States. He had an early interest in both sports, film, and technology,  using a Sears video camera to create 3D playback when he was eight years old.

Cycling career

Early years
Christopherson won his first national title in bicycle racing at age 19, beating a six-time undefeated cyclist in a controversial event at the 1995 US National Championships. His specialty was the 1,000-meter time trial, considered to be the most painful event in sprint cycling. Christopherson is one of five Americans in history to ride a sub 1:03.0 in the 1000m ‘Kilometer’ event. He was quoted "My blood was turned into battery acid...I would commonly ride that fine line of losing consciousness."

Project 96
He was named to the U.S. National Cycling Team in 1995 following a win of two national titles at the U.S. National Track Cycling Championships. Accordingly, he was made part of ‘Project 96’ to prepare for the 1996 Atlanta Olympics. The program included experimental ‘Hyperoxic' training using enriched oxygen at the U.S. Olympic Training Center. Christopherson was named official alternate to the 1996 Atlanta Olympic Cycling Team.

Union Cycliste Internationale
He made his international debut in the 1000m placing 6th at the 1996 UCI Track Cycling World Cup in Cali, Colombia, and later 7th at the same event. When racing at the international level, he never ranked lower than ninth in the world. He placed 4th at the 1997 UCI Track Cycling World Cup in Adelaide, Australia, and 9th at the 1997 UCI World Track Cycling Championships. In 1998, he transitioned to the Team Sprint event with Marty Nothstein and Erin Hartwell, winning Silver at the 1998 UCI Track Cycling World Cup Classics in Victoria, British Columbia, Canada, and 4th at the 1998 UCI Track Cycling World Championships in Bordeaux, France.

Later Olympics
He battled upper respiratory illnesses throughout the 1998 and 1999 seasons, developing walking pneumonia in 1999.

In 2000, Christopherson won the U.S. Olympic Trials in Frisco, TX in the 1000m and Team Sprint Events, and was named alternate to the  2000 Sydney Olympic Team allowed through new rules.

Following the Closing Ceremonies at the 2000 Sydney Olympics, he proposed to his girlfriend Tamara Jenkins, an Olympian in flatwater kayaking.

He continued training for the 2004 Athens Olympics, but after breaking his femur in a bike crash, decided to retire from competitive racing. He joined the Washington Athletic Club in January 2007, where he helped to create "the program that will be giving sponsorship to athletes training for the Olympics."

World record
In 2010 he made a bid to return to the 2012 London Olympics, notable by his use of a ‘digital health’ model inspired by Dr. Eric Topol. The project was a subject of a TEDx talk Christopherson gave in Del Mar, CA, and a Quantified Self talk at the Google headquarters in Mountain View, California.

The training led to a world record in the 35+ 200m velodrome sprint. The previous record holder Steven Alfred received a lifetime ban for use of performance-enhancing drugs. When asked how he trained, Christopherson stated, "In prior efforts we did not have the ability to formulate such a complete picture with data amassed continuously 24/7. This time around I benefited from genetic testing, sleep data, glucose tracking, etc."

Business career

Vicaso
Upon retirement, Christopherson began attending UC San Diego, where he studied film and graduated in 2006.

In 2005, during his studies at UCSD, he founded Vicaso, a real estate photography service. Headquartered in Seattle,  UCSD has stated "the startup was wildly successful, turning over $1.2 million in its first year."  and over $6.5 million since. The company works with brokerages such as Prudential, Redfin, and Coldwell Banker, among others. It specializes in high dynamic range (HDR) photography.

OAthlete

In July 2012 The Financial Times revealed that several health technology companies have supplied Olympics athletes with devices intended to optimize their performance, in what CNN said some people were calling "the Twitter Olympics" and the "Data Olympics."

OAthlete, a company co-founded by Christopherson, and another athlete earlier that year, helped the US track cycling team (specifically the women's sprint cycling team) track their health with glucose monitors, a sleep monitor, and genetic reports indicating nutritional needs and muscular capacity.

About using the method, Christopherson stated, "When we arrived in Spain [to consult for OAthlete] we met a [US track cycling team] that was basically underfunded and only had one coach, while comparatively their competition were well funded and had experts staffed full-time: sports physiologists, psychologists, video analysis, you name it. Without any of this, we had to figure out how to ‘boot-strap’ additional support. We started with a genetic test for each athlete to provide context for the tracking and intervention strategies. What unfolded was amazing." The women's team broke a national record two weeks before competing in London and went on to beat the favored Australians in the semi-finals, culminating their run with a silver medal at the London Olympics.

The company continues to operate as a "firm engaged in using genomics, self quantification, and bioinformatics to improve human performance."

Film career

The Greater Meaning of Water
In 2005 Christopherson began to work seriously in film, as a film producer, screenplay writer, editor, and cinematographer. He released his first feature film, The Greater Meaning of Water, to various film festivals in 2010. Executive producers included Louise Thompson, Adam Sumner, and David Christopherson. He also worked with writer J. Elizabeth Martin, and it was produced by Christopherson's film production company, Amorgen Pictures. Kirk Krack, of the documentary The Cove, also took part.

The film took over four years to complete, and follows the story of Max Avery (Justin Flint Williford), as he pursues competitive freediving as an emotional and physical respite from chronic lung disease. His love for the potentially deadly sport, however, causes a rift between Avery and his father, a cautious physician. Christopherson had first met Justin Williford when they were roommates at the Olympic Training Center, where Wiliford was a shotgun shooter.

It premiered as part of the 2010 Los Angeles All Sports Film Festival, where it won ‘Best Cinematography’ for feature film, and was voted ‘Audience Choice’ award for feature film. It also won 'Best Spiritual Film' at the 2010 Amsterdam International Film Festival.

Personal Gold

Christopherson helped his women teammates prepare for the Olympics in Mallorca, Spain, including video analysis of the training which formed the behind-the-scenes content for the documentary. The team won an ‘underdog’ Silver Medal at the 2012 London Olympic Games in the inaugural Women's Team Pursuit. It was the first US women's track cycling medal in over 20 years.

"Personal Gold" documentary was filmed in London, Palma De Mallorca in the Balearic Islands in Spain, and California. It features Dr. Eric Topol and the athletes and associates involved with the team. It is set to star Sarah Hammer, Dotsie Bausch, and Jennie Reed.

The film had its world premiere at the 2015 Seattle International Film Festival, the largest and highest attended film festival in the United States, and completed a full 40 event film festival circuit worldwide including a Great Britain premiere at the 2015 Manchester International Film Festival. The film won Audience Choice at the 2015 San Luis Obispo International Film Festival.

Personal life
Sky Christopherson's parents live in Tucson, Arizona.

Athletic achievements
1995
Gold, Kilometer, U.S National Track Cycling Championships, Indianapolis, IN
Gold, Team Sprint, U.S. National Track Cycling Championships, Indianapolis, IN
1996
6th, Kilometer, Round 1, 1996 Track World Cup, Cali
4th, Team Sprint, Round 1, 1996 Track World Cup, Cali
7th, Kilometer, Round 2, 1996 Track World Cup, Havana
5th, Team Sprint, Round 2, 1996 Track World Cup, Havana
1997
4th, Kilometer, Round 6, 1997 Track World Cup, Adelaide
1998
Gold, Team Sprint, Pan American Cycling Championships, Sao Paulo, Brazil
2nd, Team Sprint, Round 1, 1998 UCI Track Cycling World Cup Classics, Victoria
4th, Team Sprint, UCI World Track Cycling Championships, Bordeaux, France
2000
Gold, Kilo, US Olympic Trials, Track Cycling, Frisco, Texas
Gold, Team Sprint, US Olympic Trials, Track Cycling, Frisco, Texas
7th, Kilometer, Round 1, 2000 Track World Cup, Cali
2001
Gold, Team Sprint, 2001 U.S. National Track Cycling Championships, Blaine, MN
2011
World Record, 35+ 200m Time Trial, Colorado Springs, CO (August 20, 2011)

See also
Free-diving in fiction

References

External links
 
 
Optimized Athlete
Vicaso Photography

Living people
American track cyclists
American male cyclists
Angel investors
1976 births